In Major League Baseball (MLB), the 30–30 club is the group of batters who have collected thirty home runs and thirty stolen bases in a single season.  Ken Williams was the first to achieve this, doing so in 1922.  He remained the sole member of the club for 34 years until Willie Mays achieved consecutive 30–30 seasons in 1956 and 1957.  Bobby Bonds became the club's fourth member in 1969 and became the first player in MLB history to reach the 30–30 club on three occasions and ultimately on five occasions, subsequently achieving the milestone in 1973, 1975, 1977 and 1978.  He remained the only player to accomplish this until 1997, when his son Barry Bonds achieved his fifth 30–30 season.  The most recent player to reach the milestone is Cedric Mullins, who achieved the feat during the 2021 season.

In total, 43 players have reached the 30–30 club in MLB history and thirteen have done so more than once.  Of these 43 players, 29 were right-handed batters, nine were left-handed and five were switch hitters, meaning they could bat from either side of the plate.  Eight of these players (including four active members of the 30–30 club) have played for only one major league team.  The Atlanta Braves, Cincinnati Reds, Cleveland Indians, Colorado Rockies, New York Mets, and San Francisco Giants are the only franchises to have three players reach the milestone.  Five players – Hank Aaron, Barry Bonds, Willie Mays, Alex Rodriguez and Sammy Sosa – are also members of the 500 home run club, and Aaron, Mays and Rodriguez are also members of the 3,000 hit club.  Dale Murphy, Jose Canseco, Barry Bonds, Larry Walker, Jimmy Rollins, Ryan Braun and Mookie Betts won the Most Valuable Player (MVP) Award in the same year as their 30–30 season, with Bonds achieving this on two occasions (1990 and 1992).  Both Mays and Rollins also reached the 20–20–20 club in the same season.  Four players accomplished 30–30 seasons in 1987, 1996, 1997 and 2011, the most in a single season.

Due to the rarity of a player excelling in the combination of hitting home runs and stealing bases,  Baseball Digest called the 30–30 club "the most celebrated feat that can be achieved by a player who has both power and speed."  Six members of the 30–30 club have been elected to the National Baseball Hall of Fame, with Mays and Aaron elected in their first year of eligibility.  Eligibility requires that a player has been retired for at least five seasons or deceased for at least six months, disqualifying any active players and those recently retired.

Members

Notes

See also

 Baseball statistics
 Triple Crown

References
General

Specific

Major League Baseball statistics
Major League Baseball lists